Bath salts (also psychoactive bath salts, PABS, or in the United Kingdom monkey dust) are a group of recreational designer drugs. The name derives from instances in which the drugs were disguised as bath salts. The white powder, granules, or crystals often resemble Epsom salts, but differ chemically. The drugs' packaging often states "not for human consumption" in an attempt to circumvent drug prohibition laws. Additionally, they may be mislabeled as plant food, powdered cleaner, and other such products.

History 
Synthetic cathinones such as mephedrone, which are chemically similar to the cathinone naturally found in the plant Catha edulis (khat), were first synthesised in the 1920s. They remained obscure until the first decade of the 21st century when underground chemists rediscovered them and began to use them in designer drugs, as the compounds were legal in many jurisdictions. In 2009 and 2010 there was a significant rise in the use of synthetic cathinones, initially in the United Kingdom and the rest of Europe, and subsequently in the United States. Drugs marketed as "bath salts" first came to the attention of authorities in the US in 2010 after reports were made to US poison centers. In Europe, the drugs were predominantly purchased from websites, but in the US they were mainly sold in small independent stores such as gas stations and head shops. In the US, this often made them easier to obtain than cigarettes and alcohol. Bath salts have also been sold online in small packets.

Hundreds of other designer drugs or "legal highs" have been reported, including artificial chemicals such as synthetic cannabis and semi-synthetic substances such as methylhexaneamine. These drugs are primarily developed to avoid being controlled by laws against illegal drugs, thus giving them the label designer drugs.

In the US, the number of calls to poison centers concerning "bath salts" rose from 304 in 2010 to 6,138 in 2011, according to the American Association of Poison Control Centers. Calls related to bath salts then began to decrease; by 2015, the number had declined to 522.

Pharmacology 
Pharmacologically, bath salts usually contain a cathinone, typically methylenedioxypyrovalerone (MDPV), methylone or mephedrone; however, the chemical composition varies widely and products labeled with the same name may also contain derivatives of pyrovalerone or pipradrol. In Europe the main synthetic cathinone is mephedrone, whereas in the US MDPV is more common.

Very little is known about how bath salts interact with the brain and how they are metabolized by the body. Scientists are inclined to believe that bath salts have a powerful addictive potential and can increase users' tolerance. They are similar to amphetamines in that they cause stimulant effects by increasing the concentration of monoamines such as dopamine, serotonin, and norepinephrine in synapses. They are generally less able to cross the blood brain barrier than amphetamines due to the presence of a beta-keto group that increases the compound's polarity.

Usage 
Bath salts can be ingested orally, snorted, smoked, or injected. Bath salts can be detrimental to human health and can potentially cause erratic behavior, hallucinations, and delusions. This is often due to their wakefullness-promoting effect, leading to insomnia.

Interaction with alcohol 
Bath salts are often consumed concurrently with alcohol. A 2015 study has investigated the interrelation between mephedrone and alcohol, focusing on psychostimulant and rewarding effects. It showed that alcohol, at low (non-stimulant) doses, significantly enhances the psychostimulant effects of mephedrone. This effect is mediated by an increase in synaptic dopamine, as haloperidol, but not ketanserin, was capable of blocking the potentiation by alcohol.

Subjective effects 
Bath salts or monkey dust come in a powdered or crystallised form which can be swallowed, smoked, injected or snorted. Subjective effects are similar to MDMA or cocaine but with a duration of 5–6 hours. Both substances cause a rapid onset of action in the central nervous system, and stimulant toxicity. In larger doses this class of substances can cause effects similar to those seen in cases of serotonin syndrome. Due to their rapid onset, synthetic cathinones are powerful reward/reinforcers, with high addiction potential. "Monkey dust", "bath salts" or plant food are often used at the same time as classical psychoactive drugs. Users who have overdosed often display symptoms of agitation, delirium, hallucinations, excessive motor activity, seizures, tachycardia, hypertension, and/or hyperthermia.

Health issues 
Bath salt/Monkey dust users have reported symptoms that include headache, heart palpitations, nausea, cold fingers, hallucinations, paranoia, and panic attacks. News media have reported reactions that include violent behavior, heart attack, kidney failure, liver failure, suicide, an increased tolerance for pain, dehydration, and breakdown of skeletal muscle tissue. Furthermore, there is evidence to support the claim that a psychoactive compound could catalyze psychosis in a person who is already susceptible to psychotic disorders.

Visual symptoms similar to those of stimulant overdoses include dilated pupils, involuntary muscle movement, rapid heartbeat, and high blood pressure.

Detection 
MDPV and other synthetic cathinones cannot be smelled by detection dogs and are not detected by typical urinalysis, though they can be detected in urine and hair using gas chromatography-mass spectrometry or liquid chromatography-mass spectrometry. Distributors may disguise the drug as everyday substances such as fertilizer or insect repellent.

Prevalence 
Little is known about how many people use bath salts. In the UK, mephedrone, commonly known as MCAT, is the fourth most commonly used illicit drug among nightclub goers after cannabis, MDMA and cocaine. Based on reports to the American Association of Poison Control Centers, use of bath salts in the US is thought to have increased significantly between 2010 and 2011. The increase in use is thought to result from their widespread availability, undetectability on many drug tests, and sensationalist media coverage.

User's age tends to range from 15 to 55, with the average age being 28.

Legal status 

The drug policy of Canada since Fall 2012 categorizes methylenedioxypyrovalerone (MDPV) as a schedule I substance under the Controlled Drugs and Substances Act, placing it in the same category as heroin and MDMA. Mephedrone and methylone are already illegal in Canada and most of the United States.

In the United Kingdom, all substituted cathinones were made illegal in April 2010, under the Misuse of Drugs Act 1971, but other designer drugs such as naphyrone appeared soon after and some products described as legal contained illegal compounds. To avoid being controlled by the Medicines Act, designer drugs such as mephedrone have been described as "bath salts", or other misnomers such as "plant food" despite the compounds having no history of being used for these purposes.

In July 2012, US federal drug policy was amended to ban the drugs commonly found in bath salts. Prior to that, bath salts were legal in at least 41 states. Prior to the compounds being made illegal, mephedrone, methylone, and MDPV were marketed as bath salts. The "bath salt" name and labels that say "not for human consumption" are an attempt to skirt the Federal Analog Act, which forbids selling drugs that are substantially similar to drugs already classified for human use.

Society and the media 
Use of bath salts or monkey dust has spread through social media. Anecdotal reports of the drug lowering its users' pain thresholds while simultaneously giving them increased strength can largely be attributed to the emergency services and frontline NHS staff. Such reports have been picked up, and sensationalised by the regional and tabloid press. In the city Stoke-on-Trent, Monkey Dust has been reported to be an entirely new compound, when in fact preparations of MDPV and MDPHP or "bath salts" have been available since the early 2000s. The print press and broadcast media have often used textual framing techniques to report on synthetic cathinone use among society's most vulnerable. Terms like "epidemic", "zombie attack" and more recently "incredible hulk" are often used when describing users. In August 2018, Staffordshire police said they were receiving around ten calls per day regarding Monkey Dust. However, it was not clear whether the incidents actually involved Monkey Dust, or a combination of substances.

Contrary to popular belief, during the investigation of the Miami cannibal attack toxicologists found no trace of the components in bath salts during the autopsy of the attacker. But some scientist doubt the claim that no bath salts were involved in the ordeal and say that due to the meager testing capabilities a bath salt could have gone undetected.

Bath Salts or Monkey dust were originally a research chemical or legal highs. Users would purchase the chemicals off the internet, ingest them and blog about the effects.

See also 
 Illegal drug trade
 Recreational drug use

References 

Drug culture
Drug policy